Long Island is an island town in Cumberland County, Maine, which seceded from the city of Portland in 1993.  The population was 234 at the 2020 census. It is part of the Portland–South Portland–Biddeford, Maine Metropolitan Statistical Area.

Geography

Demographics

The total population of 202 only includes year-round residents.  A significant number of seasonal residents causes the population to swell to over 700 during the summer.  There are 175 registered voters on Long Island.

Long Island maintains its own elementary school from grades K–5, but sends students to Portland for schooling from grades 6 through 12.

2010 census

As of the census of 2010, there were 230 people, 99 households, and 70 families living in the town. The racial makeup of the town was 93.5% White, 2.2% African American, 0.4% Native American, 2.6% Asian, 0.4% from other races, and 0.9% from two or more races. Hispanic or Latino of any race were 2.2% of the population.

There were 99 households, of which 23.2% had children under the age of 18 living with them, 58.6% were married couples living together, 7.1% had a female householder with no husband present, 5.1% had a male householder with no wife present, and 29.3% were non-families. 26.3% of all households were made up of individuals, and 8.1% had someone living alone who was 65 years of age or older. The average household size was 2.32 and the average family size was 2.80.

The median age in the town was 52 years. 20.4% of residents were under the age of 18; 5.2% were between the ages of 18 and 24; 15.2% were from 25 to 44; 30.5% were from 45 to 64; and 28.7% were 65 years of age or older. The gender makeup of the town was 49.6% male and 50.4% female.

2000 census
As of the census of 2000, there were 202 people, 93 households, and 61 families living in the town. The racial makeup of the town was 97.03% White, 0.99% Asian, and 1.98% from two or more races. Hispanic or Latino of any race were 0.50% of the population.

There were 93 households, out of which 31.2% had children under the age of 18 living with them, 46.2% were married couples living together, 16.1% had a female householder with no husband present, and 34.4% were non-families. 32.3% of all households were made up of individuals, and 10.8% had someone living alone who was 65 years of age or older. The average household size was 2.17 and the average family size was 2.70.

In the town, the population was spread out, with 25.2% under the age of 18, 3.5% from 18 to 24, 22.8% from 25 to 44, 30.2% from 45 to 64, and 18.3% who were 65 years of age or older. The median age was 44 years. For every 100 females, there were 100.0 males. For every 100 females age 18 and over, there were 91.1 males.

The median income for a household in the town was $35,833, and the median income for a family was $43,214. Males had a median income of $28,125 versus $28,750 for females. The per capita income for the town was $15,278. About 10.0% of families and 10.0% of the population were below the poverty line, including 8.6% of those under the age of eighteen and 11.1% of those 65 or over.

History 

Long Island, like other Casco Bay islands, was originally inhabited in the warm months by Native Americans until European settlers first arrived in the 17th century. Col. Ezekiel Cushing purchased the island in 1732 and is credited with being the first European to settle and build a house on the island.  He died in 1765, and willed the island to his nine surviving children. Soon after, other settlers arrived to make a livelihood out of farming, fishing, and catching lobsters.

During World War II, Casco Bay became United States Navy base Sail for destroyers escorting HX, SC, and ON convoys of the Battle of the Atlantic.  Facilities constructed on the island included the Torpedo Control Officers School of the Portland Naval Training Center, a navy supply pier with a naval fuel annex often cited as a source of contamination for both the island's marsh and Casco Bay, and the Naval Auxiliary Air Facility Casco Bay seaplane base operated as part of Naval Air Station Brunswick from 14 May 1943 to 15 December 1946. The United States Army Coast Artillery Corps built two batteries of 90 mm dual-purpose guns on the island as the Long Island Military Reservation, part of the Harbor Defenses of Portland.

After the war, tourism became the most popular industry, and several small stores, a fire station, and a K–5 school (1953) were built. In the summer, several hundred or even thousands of tourists travel from places such as Massachusetts and New York to vacation in their summer cottages.

The island was originally part of the city of Portland, which re-evaluated property taxes in 1990. Due in part to high real estate prices paid by out-of-state residents and property aesthetic values, property taxes increased substantially. Many residents felt this move created an unfair discrepancy between the money paid to the City of Portland and the services they received in return. The island voted to secede from Portland, and on July 1, 1993, the island was declared the Town of Long Island. The Long Island Historical Society now houses every news article that was printed about the secession movement as well as video and film footage of the secession ceremonies. These archives also include copies of the local and national news coverage given to the community during its "rebellion".

References

External links

Town of Long Island official website
Long Island Community Library
Long Island School
Casco Bay Lines

History of Portland, Maine
Islands of Cumberland County, Maine
Towns in Cumberland County, Maine
Portland metropolitan area, Maine
Islands of Casco Bay
Populated coastal places in Maine
Islands of Maine
Closed installations of the United States Navy